Kensington is an unincorporated community in Walker County, Georgia, United States, northwest of LaFayette.

History
A post office called Kensington was established in 1890, and remained in operation until it was discontinued in 1965. The community was named after Kensington, Pennsylvania.

Historic sites
Kensington contains three properties or districts that are listed on the U.S. National Register of Historic Places:
Lane House (Kensington, Georgia)
McLemore Cove Historic District
Miller Brothers Farm

References

Unincorporated communities in Georgia (U.S. state)
Unincorporated communities in Walker County, Georgia